Eagle*Seagull's self-titled debut album was released 2005 on Paper Garden Records.  The album was recorded in a basement by Ian Aiello. HearNebraska writer Zach Zlomke writes the album has, "lush soundscapes and epic, stadium-sized build-ups quickly garnered attention."

Track listing
All tracks by Eli Mardock except where noted.

 "Lock and Key" – 6:23
 "Photograph" – 6:10
 "Hello, Never" (Idt, Mardock) – 3:40
 "Death Could Be at the Door" (Mardock, Mike Overfield) – 3:59
 "It was a Lovely Parade" – 1:35
 "Holy" – 5:11
 "Your Beauty is a Knife I Turn On My Throat" – 5:45
 "It's So Sexy" – 7:01
 "Last Song" – 4:56
 "Heal It/Feel It" (Ian Aeillo, Mardock) – 4:12
 "Ballet or Art" – 6:46

Personnel 
Ian Aeillo – bass, guitar, engineer, mixing
Britt Hayes – drums
J.J. Idt – banjo, guitar
Tim Jensen – drums
Eli Mardock – guitar, keyboards, vocals
Mike Overfield – bass
Austin Skiles – guitar, vocals

References

External links
Eagle*Seagull on MySpace.com
Paper Garden Records
Paper Garden Records on MySpace.com

2005 debut albums
Eagle Seagull albums